Rosenius is a Swedish surname. Notable people with the surname include:

Bengt Rosenius (1918–1979), Swedish Air Force major general
Carl Olof Rosenius (1816–1868), Swedish preacher, author and editor
Frank Rosenius (born 1940), Swedish Navy vice admiral
Nils Rosenius, Swedish figure skater

Swedish-language surnames